Sinobaatar is a genus of extinct mammal from the Lower Cretaceous of China. It is categorized within the also extinct order Multituberculata and among these it belongs to the plagiaulacid lineage (a possible infraorder). Sinobaatar was a small herbivore during the Mesozoic era, commonly called "the age of the dinosaurs". The genus was named by Hu Y. and Wang Y. in 2002.  Three species have been described.

It has been found in Lower Cretaceous strata of the Yixian Formation in Liaoning, China. According to Hu & Wang (2002),
"[t]he dental features of Sinobaatar show again that eobaatarids are obviously intermediate between Late Jurassic multituberculates and the later forms".
Many Multituberculata are only known from teeth, but the type specimen of Sinobaatar is a reasonably complete skeleton.

Sinobaatar was eaten, at least on occasion, by the feathered dinosaur Sinosauropteryx prima (Hurum et al. 2006).

Etymology
The name Sinobaatar is a Latin and Mongolian mixture of "Sino–" and "Bataar" (Baghatur) and means "Chinese hero". The type species name is in honor of Lingyuan City.

References
 Hurum, Jørn H.; Luo, Zhe-Xi & Kielan-Jaworowska, Zofia (2006): Were mammals originally venomous? Acta Palaeontologica Polonica 51(1): 1–11. PDF fulltext
 Kielan-Jaworowska, Zofia & Hurum, Jørn H. (2001): Phylogeny and Systematics of multituberculate mammals. Paleontology 44: 389–429.
 Kusuhashi, Hu, Wang, Setoguchi & Matsuoka (2009): Two eobaatarid (Multituberculata; Mammalia) genera from the Lower Cretaceous Shahai and Fuxin Formations, Northeastern China.  Journal of Vertebrate Paleontology 29(4): 1264–1288.  
 Hu & Wang (2002): Sinobaatar gen. nov.: First multituberculate from the Jehol Biota of Liaoning, Northeast China. Chinese Science Bulletin 47(11): 933–938.
 Much of the above material has been derived from Mesozoic Mammals: Plagiaulacidae, Albionbaataridae, Eobaataridae & Arginbaataridae

Cretaceous mammals
Multituberculates
Prehistoric animals of China
Yixian fauna
Prehistoric mammal genera